This is a list of the governors of the province of Faryab, Afghanistan.

Governors of Faryab Province

See also
 List of current governors of Afghanistan

Notes

Faryab